Benito Zambrano (Lebrija, 20 March 1965), is an awarded Spanish  screenwriter and film director. His film Habana Blues was screened in the Un Certain Regard section at the 2005 Cannes Film Festival. He studied at Escuela Internacional de Cine y Television in San Antonio de Los Baños, Cuba.

Filmography
 Melli 1990 (short film)
 Un niño mal nacido 1989 (short film)
 ¿Quién soy yo? 1988  (short film)
 La última humillación 1987 (short film)
 ¿Para qué sirve un río? 1991
 Los que se quedaron 1993
 El encanto de la luna llena 1995
 Solas 1998
 Padre Coraje 2002 (tv miniserie)
 Habana Blues 2005
 La voz dormida (The Sleeping Voice) 2011
 Intemperie (Out in the Open) 2019
 Pan de limón con semillas de amapola (Lemon and Poppy Seed Cake'') 2021

References

External links
 

1965 births
Living people
People from Lebrija
Spanish male screenwriters
Spanish film directors
Film directors from Andalusia
21st-century Spanish screenwriters